Eresiomera paradoxa is a butterfly in the family Lycaenidae. It is found in Cameroon, the Republic of the Congo and Uganda.

Subspecies
Eresiomera paradoxa paradoxa (Cameroon, Congo)
Eresiomera paradoxa orientalis (Stempffer, 1962) (Uganda: Kalinzu Forest)

References

Butterflies described in 1917
Poritiinae
Butterflies of Africa